Methionyl-tRNA synthetase, cytoplasmic is an enzyme that in humans is encoded by the MARS gene.

Aminoacyl-tRNA synthetases are a class of enzymes that charge tRNAs with their cognate amino acids. The protein encoded by this gene belongs to the class I family of tRNA synthetases.

References

Further reading